Fabian Holthaus (born 17 January 1995) is a German professional football left back who plays for Rot-Weiß Oberhausen.

Career statistics

References

External links

1995 births
Living people
Sportspeople from Hamm
German footballers
Association football defenders
Germany youth international footballers
Hammer SpVg players
VfL Bochum players
VfL Bochum II players
Fortuna Düsseldorf players
Dynamo Dresden players
FC Hansa Rostock players
FC Energie Cottbus players
FC Viktoria Köln players
Rot-Weiß Oberhausen players
Regionalliga players
3. Liga players
2. Bundesliga players
Footballers from North Rhine-Westphalia